The 1991 Stella Artois Championships was a men's tennis tournament played on grass courts at the Queen's Club in London in the United Kingdom and was part of the World Series of the 1991 ATP Tour. It was the 89th edition of the tournament and was held from 10 through 17 June 1991. Stefan Edberg won the singles event and Todd Woodbridge / Mark Woodforde won the doubles title.

Finals

Singles

 Stefan Edberg defeated  David Wheaton 6–2, 6–3
 It was Edberg's 3rd title of the year and the 45th of his career.

Doubles

 Todd Woodbridge /  Mark Woodforde defeated  Grant Connell /  Glenn Michibata 6–4, 7–6
 It was Woodbridge's 3rd title of the year and the 5th of his career. It was Woodforde's 3rd title of the year and the 10th of his career.

References

External links
 Official website
 ATP tournament profile

 
Stella Artois Championships
Queen's Club Championships
Stella Artois Championships
Stella Artois Championships
Stella Artois Championships